Ramchandrasuri (1896 – 1991) was a Jain monk and scholar .

Biography
Ramchandrasuri was born on 3 March 1896 (Falgun Vad 4, Vikram Samvat 1952) in Padara village (now in Gujarat). He was a disciple of Acharya shri Prem Surishwarji and was initiated in monkhood by Muni Mangalvijayji at Gandhar (now in Gujarat) in 1912 (Pushya Vad 13, VS 1969). He died in 1991 (Ashadha Vad 15, VS 2047). The centenary of his initiation in asceticism was celebrated in Palitana, Ahmedabad, Mumbai and Gandhar in 2012.

Order
Ramchandrasuri established the Ramchandrasuri Samuday, an order of Tapa Gaccha sub-sect of Svetambara Jainism. The Gachhadhipati, head of the Samuday, Hembhushansuri died in 2008 at Delhi. On 29 March 2011, Punyapalsuri  was appointed as a new Gachhadhipati at Palitana, Gujarat

References

1896 births
1991 deaths
Indian Jain monks
20th-century Indian Jains
20th-century Jain monks
20th-century Indian monks
Jain acharyas
Śvētāmbara monks